Bungamati, is a settlement in Lalitpur Metropolitan Region, Ward No. 22 in Lalitpur District, Nepal. Bungamati is a Newar town on a spur of land overlooking the Bagmati River

The first stele of the Licchavi king Amshuverma was found in Bungamati and dated to 605. It contains the earliest mention of the Kailashkut Bhawan palace.

Names and history
During the Licchavi Kingdom, the town was called Bugayumigrama. The word 'Bugayumi' is a Kiratian dialect so it is the proof that the settlement had come into existence since Kirati period before the Christian Era. During the Malla period, it was called Bungapattan. Bungamati is also called Amarapur or Amaravatipur.

The original settlement of Bungamati was located uphills around the recent 'Chunikhel' area; recent 'Bungamati' being the place of cremation surrounded by huge forest, the original place is still called 'Bugal'. It is said that when Red Machhindranath was brought into the valley then the settlement was shifted to present location of Bungamati after the temple of Red Machhindranath was constructed.

Temples and monasteries
Bungamati is the hometown of the deity Machhindranath, regarded as the patron of the valley and his large shikhara-style temple in the center of the village square is his home for six months of the year; he spends the rest of his time in Patan. The process of moving him back and forth between Patan and Bungamati is one of the most important annual festivals in the valley.

The Karya Binayak Temple, one of the most important temples in Nepal, is dedicated to Ganesha. The view is spectacular from the temple, which is surrounded by trees and large bamboo and overlooks the Bagmati valley to the foothills.

Machhindranath Temple

The central ritual focus of Bungamati is the Temple of Machhindranath. To the villagers, Machhindranath is known by the name “Bungadeya”; the name is derived either after the village founded at the spot where Bhairav howled “bu” (birthplace) or from the word “Bungaa:” meaning “watering place” or “spring” like the explanation of the name of the village and several residents in Bungamati offer the second derivation. Bungadeya has many important mythological, historical and contemporary ritual associations with water. Bungadeya being a primordial rain god, who was later identified with the benevolent Aryavalokiteshvara. Machhindranath is also known by the name of “Karunamaya” meaning an embodiment of love and kindness like a mother figure. While Bungamati Newa people refer to Machhindranath as Bungadeya, Newas from other parts of the valley use the name Karunamaya to refer to Machhindranath. The god of Bungamati and Patan is also identified as Raktapadmapani Lokeshvara and Aryavalokiteshvara.

Another important part of historical importance in Bungamati is the living goddess, Kumari. Generally, people only know three Kumaris (in Kathmandu, Patan, and Bhaktapur), but there is also one in Bungamati.

Hayangriva Bhairab Temple

Hayangriva is chief Bhairav among all the ancient Bhairavs of Kathmandu Valley. The protector and ancestor  god of Bungamati is Hayangriva Bhairav.

There is no written record of when this temple was established, but the Salivanjika tundal in the temple before the demolition indicates the existence of this temple since ancient times, as it shows pre-medieval art.  The copperplate and stone tablets of the Malla period mentioned in the context of repair and restoration have been found.
In Kirati settlements, the concept of ancestor god is found. The scenario of  arrival of Bundya Karunamay: Led by Hayangriva Bhairav of Bungamati, Svet Bhairav of Lubhu, Krodh Bhairav of Harisiddhi, Sanhar (Tika) Bhairav of Lele and Chandra Bhairav of Patan-Ikhalakhu to Nepalmandal proves that Hayangriva Bhairav existed when  Machhindranath was brought here.

There are some meanings of the word Hangreve or Haygreve - even if one is in a state of fearlessness, the real meaning is - Horse-Neck.  The shape of a small horse is on the head of this Bhairav.  Since the compassionate (Bodhisattva) is shown in the symbol of the flying horse as in the story of Simhasarthabahu, Hayagriva Bhairav can be taken as a devotee of that horse.  In Tibetan Nyingmapa, Bajrayani Buddhism also shows this Hanyagriva Bhairav as a Bodhisattva.

This Bhairav also has a red face like that of Bungadya which has three eyes - which is 'laughing' even though it looks like it is drowning in anger.
This temple also has a quadrangular design like other Bhairav temples in Nepal Mandal, the eastern part of which is covered with the structure of Chaura Guthi.  According to Eastern philosophy, the quadrilateral is the name given to the universe which is similar to our father.  Hayangriva is like Bungamati's father or king.  As a local king, there is a popular belief that kings of the Shah's time should not come to Bungamati or they will die.

It is said that this idol of Hayangriv Bhairav was uprooted by King Mukundasen of Palpa by attacking Bungamati and taking it to Palpa.  He later apologized for his misdeeds and re-established again in Bungamati.  The tradition of worshiping this forgiveness has been going on till today.

There is a tradition of worshiping in this temple first on special festivals and rituals of Bungamati.  Immersion of good deeds like brat-adhisthan etc. should also be done by coming to this temple.  The priests of this temple are called 'Delaju Khala:'.

Manakamana Temple or Aju/Aji Bhairav Temple

Bungamati is also abode of Goddess Manakamana. People believe that Manakamana is in Gorkha district, but the fact is the original Manakamana is in Bungamati. It is said that upper part of the body of Goddess above navel is in Bungamati and lower part of the body below navel is in Gorkha.

Bungamati observes Manakamana Jatra as the main festival of Bungamati which usually occurs in the month of October during Navami, Dashami and Ekadashami of Dashain festival. During those three days the temple at Gorkha is shut down and the priest sends the devotees to Bungamati

Shristikanta Lokeshvara Temple

Bungamati is the birthplace of Shristikanta Lokeshvara, the god attributed to the creation (shristi) of overall living entities of the world.

There is ample of evidences that shows Bungamati as the foremost settlement of Kathmandu Valley, and one of the reason is it is the abode of Shristikanta Lokeshvara who created existence of Nepa Valley.

Karyabinayak Temple

Karyabinayak Temple was built on the fourth Thursday of the month of Chait in Nepal Samvat 781 (1661 AD) under the leadership of leader Purna Singh of Bungamati.  At this time the reign of Shri Niwas Malla had just begun in Patan. Inside this temple, worship is done on a naturally formed stone in the shape of Ganesha.  But now, a statue of Ganesha covered with artistic silver is also kept.

Karyabinayak is one of the four famous Vinayakas of Kathmandu Valley.  Other Vinayakas are Jal Binayak of Chobhar, Surya Binayak of Bhaktapur and Ashok Binayak of Kathmandu.Before starting any work, devotees come to Karyabinayak to wish for the successful completion of that work.  Devotees get crowded on Tuesdays and Saturdays.

Most of the priests have come to this temple with the surname 'Tuladhar'.  The association of priests is also called 'Nine Priests Association'.  On the day of Paha Chahre (during the Ghoda Jatra) there is a Karyabinayak deity procession in Bungamati.The people of Bungamati call this place Gale, which means forest.  Therefore, Karyabinayak is also a famous picnic spot. The temple is built in a small size in the tiered style, which was renovated during the reign of King Mahendra.

April 2015 Nepal earthquake

After the April 2015 Nepal earthquake, the city saw a massive destruction as most of its houses were made up of traditional mud and brick elements.

Almost three years after the earthquake residents in Bungamati have yet to see any restoration work. Both residential homes and historic monuments remain in ruins. Faced with a winter of little shelter residents moved back into damaged buildings.

Gallery

References

External links
UN map of the municipalities of Lalitpur District
Fourth Kumari of Bungamati

Populated places in Lalitpur District, Nepal